Emer Dillon born 1984 in Cork is a camogie player and a marketing executive, winner of All Ireland camogie medals in 2002, 2005, 2006, and 2009 and a camogie All Star in 2005. Emer was selected as player of the match in the 2005 All-Ireland Senior final. She is also a prominent hockey player and has represented both Munster and Ireland. She holds a Senior county championship medal with Carrigdhoun and also Junior and under-age championship honours with Ballygarvan. She has won All-Ireland Senior, Intermediate and Minor medals as well as inter-provincial honours but did not participate in the 2008 championship due to study.

References

External links 
 Denise Cronin’s championship diary in On The Ball Official Camogie Magazine
 https://web.archive.org/web/20091228032101/http://www.rte.ie/sport/gaa/championship/gaa_fixtures_camogie_oduffycup.html Fixtures and results] for the 2009 O'Duffy Cup
 All-Ireland Senior Camogie Championship: Roll of Honour

1984 births
Living people
Cork camogie players